Kelly Bryant (born September 25, 1996) is a professional gridiron football quarterback who plays for the Zappers of the Fan Controlled Football league. He played college football for the Missouri Tigers after previously playing for the Clemson Tigers.

Early years
Bryant attended Wren High School in Piedmont, South Carolina. As a senior, he had 3,579 passing yards with 41 passing touchdowns, 720 rushing yards, and 14 rushing touchdowns. He committed to Clemson University to play college football under head coach Dabo Swinney.  During Bryant's junior year of high school, he was unable to play in the first half of a game, as he was vomiting blood in the locker room. Bryant was taken to the hospital and after an MRI, doctors found a large abscess blocking his lower intestine. Had this abscess not been found, it may have burst, leading to a life-threatening infection in his entire body. Doctors were successfully able to remove the abscess through an emergency surgery.

College career

Clemson
Bryant spent his first two years at Clemson as a backup to Deshaun Watson. During the two years, he completed 13 of 19 passes for 75 yards with a touchdown and interception. He also had 178 rushing yards over 35 carries with three touchdowns. During this time, Clemson would win both the 2015 and 2016 ACC Championships, as well as the 2017 CFP National Championship.

After Watson left for the 2017 NFL Draft, Bryant was named Clemson's starting quarterback to open the 2017 season. Bryant led the Tigers to the 2017 ACC Championship, and a spot in the 2017 College Football Playoff, losing to eventual national champion Alabama in the Sugar Bowl. The 2017 Clemson Tigers finished the season with a record of 12–2.

On September 25, 2018, after week 4 of the 2018 season, coach Dabo Swinney announced that freshman Trevor Lawrence would be the new starting quarterback for the Tigers. As a result, Bryant decided to transfer. He maintained his final year of eligibility, despite starting 4 games of his senior year, due to a recent change in NCAA redshirt guidelines. The Tigers would go on to win the 2019 CFP Championship. Due to Bryant's decision to leave the team early in the season, Swinney chose not to give Bryant a championship ring.

Missouri
On December 5, 2018, Bryant announced that he would transfer to Missouri. The following year he became a quarterback for the 2019 Missouri Tigers. In the Tigers' first game of the 2019 season, a 37–31 loss at Wyoming, Bryant threw a career-high 423 yards.

Professional career
After going undrafted in the 2020 NFL Draft, Bryant had a tryout with the Arizona Cardinals on August 14, 2020. On February 9, 2021, it was announced that Bryant had signed with the Toronto Argonauts, where his cousin, Martavis Bryant, had signed two weeks earlier. Bryant was released on June 18, 2021. Bryant re-signed with Toronto partially through training camp on July 22. In the one month interim between Argonauts stints, Bryant played two games for the Bismarck Bucks of the Indoor Football League, where he completed four out of five passes for 48 yards and a touchdown, and 11 rushes for 87 yards.

On March 30, 2022, Bryant signed with the Zappers of the Fan Controlled Football league. On his debut the following day on April 1, Bryant threw for 130 yards and 2 touchdowns with no interceptions, whilst also rushing for an extra two touchdowns on 47 yards. He would go on to throw for 234 yards, 5 touchdowns, and 2 interceptions for the season with a 55% completion rating. Kelly Bryant went on to win the FCF People's Championship later that season as well as being named the game's MVP.

References

External links
 Toronto Argonauts profile
 Missouri profile
 Clemson profile

1996 births
Living people
American football quarterbacks
Clemson Tigers football players
Missouri Tigers football players
People from Calhoun Falls, South Carolina
Players of American football from South Carolina
Toronto Argonauts players
Bismarck Bucks players